The Governors' Domain and Civic Precinct is a listed site on the Australian National Heritage List. The site is immediately to the east of the Sydney Central Business District (CBD), separating the CBD from the neighbourhood of Woolloomooloo. The site includes the Domain, the Royal Botanic Gardens, Hyde Park, Macquarie Street and Bridge Street and associated buildings.

References

Australian National Heritage List
Sydney